Kotharia is a town in Rajsamand district of Rajasthan, which was the headquarters of the former 1st class jagir (estate) of the House of Kotharia, part of the Udaipur (Mewar) state, which was in Mewar Residency in Rajputana Agency.

It is situated on the right bank of the Banas River about 50 km. northeast of Udaipur, and 5 km. from Nathdwara.

History
The first ruler of Kotharia were the descendants of the last Chauhan king of Ranthambhor, Raja Hamir Singh, about 1302. Whose descendants settled in Mainpuri in  uttar pradesh state of present-day India.

During the Battle of Khanwa, when Mughal Emperor Babur fought Maharana Sangram Singh (Rana Sanga) on 17 March 1527, one of them was Manik Chand Chauhan, a chieftain from the village Rajor in present Mainpuri district, Uttar Pradesh, who joined Rana Sanga with his 4,000 men and fought to the death. After the war, he was posthumously rewarded with the jagir of Kotharia and the title of ‘Rawat’. Manik Chand's sons opted to remain in Kotharia and serve Mewar, and were among the first rank of Mewar's nobles (the First 16 Umraos).

In 1802, Rawat Vijay Singh Chauhan fought against Jaswant Rao Holkar's invading army near Nathdwara, when Holkar was on his way to attack ShrinathJi Temple at Nathdwara. Vijay Singh and his men fell in the battle.

Rawat Jodh Singh Chauhan was known to anti-British and he provided refuge to many rebels during rebellion of 1857, including Kushal Singh of Auwa. Peshwa Pandu Rang had also requested him to help mutineers.

In 1901, the town had a population of 1,586 and the estate had 81 villages under it.

Genealogy
 Rawat Manik Chand Chauhan  
 Rawat Jaipal Chauhan  
 Rawat Sarangdeo Chauhan  
 Rawat Tatar Khan Chauhan  
 Rawat Dharmangad Chauhan  
 Rawat Sahib Khan Chauhan  
 Rawat Prithviraj Chauhan  
 Rawat Rukmangad Chauhan  
 Rawat Udaibhan Chauhan  
 Rawat Devbhan Chauhan  
 Rawat Budh Singh Chauhan  
 Rawat Fateh Singh Chauhan  
 Rawat Vijai Singh Chauhan  
 Rawat Mokham Singh Chauhan  
 Rawat Jodh Singh Chauhan  
 Rawat Sangram Singh Chauhan  
 Rawat Keshri Singh Chauhan  
 Rawat Javan Singh Chauhan  
 Rawat Arjun Singh Chauhan  
 Rawat Man Singh Chauhan  
 Rawat Shivpratap Singh Chauhan  
 Rawat Mahesh Pratap Singh Chauhan.
 Kunwar Mrigraj Singh Chauhan

References

External links
 Kotharia, Rajasthan at wikimapia

Princely states of India
Mewar
Villages in Rajsamand district